The political leadership of the Chinese Communist Party (CCP) and the People's Republic of China (PRC) is in the hands of several offices.

CCP Leaders after PRC established

Heads of the People's Republic of China

Premiers of the People's Republic of China

Chairmen of the NPC Standing Committee

Chairmen of the CPPCC National Committee

Chairmen of the CCP Central Military Commission

Government of China
Positions of authority